Ramoty  is a village in the administrative district of Gmina Łukta, within Ostróda County, Warmian-Masurian Voivodeship, in northern Poland.

The village has a population of 270.

References

Ramoty